Siniša Štemberger (born April 23, 1979) is a Croatian professional basketball player currently playing for Zapruđe in the Croatian second-tier Prva muška liga. He previously played for and served as an assistant coach for Kvarner 2010.

During his career he played for Croatian and Bosnian clubs with the exception of the Slovakian Astrum Levice where he spent the 2011-12 season. He signed with Zapruđe on March 17, 2022.

He holds the record of most scored 3-point shots in ABA League.

References

External links
 Profile at eurobasket.com
 Profile at abaliga.com

1979 births
Living people
ABA League players
Croatian men's basketball players
KK Igokea players
KK Split players
KK Zadar players
Basketball players from Rijeka
HKK Široki players
Guards (basketball)
KK Kvarner players
KK Kvarner 2010 players
KK Škrljevo players